Muhlenbergia montana, the mountain muhly, is a species of grass. It is native to North and Central America, where it is found throughout the Western United States, the Sierra Nevada, Mexico, and Guatemala.

It can be found in several types of habitat, including grassland, rocky outcrops, mountains, and open areas.

Description
Muhlenbergia montana is a perennial bunchgrass forming tufts of stems 10 to 40 centimeters tall. The inflorescence is an open array of spreading or upright branches bearing small, awned spikelets.

Etymology
The Latin specific epithet montana refers to mountains or coming from mountains.

References

External links
Jepson Manual Treatment - Muhlenbergia montana
USDA Plants Profile
Grass Manual Treatment
US Forest Service Fire Ecology
Muhlenbergia montana - Photo gallery

montana
Bunchgrasses of North America
Grasses of Mexico
Grasses of the United States
Native grasses of California
Flora of the Sierra Nevada (United States)
Flora of Guatemala
Flora of Central America